The 1972 Buenos Aires 1000 Kilometers was the opening round of the 1972 World Championship for Makes season.  It took place at the Autódromo Oscar Alfredo Gálvez, Argentina, on January 10, 1972.  This would be the last time that the World Championship ran in a South American country.

Grand tourer class cars did not participate in this event.

Official results
Class winners in bold.  Cars failing to complete 70% of the winner's distance marked as Not Classified (NC).

Statistics
 Pole Position - #30 SpA Ferrari SEFAC - 1:58.59
 Fastest Lap - #12 Ecurie Bonnier - 1:58.39
 Average Speed - 173.886 km/h

References

 

1000 km Buenos Aires
1000 km Buenos Aires
1972 in motorsport